Mabton Junior Senior High School is a public high school located in Mabton, Washington that serves 260 students in grades 9–12. 98% of the students are Hispanic, while 1% are Asian and 1% are white.

Alumni
Mel Stottlemyre : Major League Baseball player

References

External links
Mabton Junior/Senior H.S.
Mabton School District #120

Public high schools in Washington (state)
High schools in Yakima County, Washington